Thanasis Saravakos (18 January 1932 – 13 January 2009) was a Greek international football player who played as a forward for Panionios. He played in three matches for the Greece national football team from 1962 to 1965.

See also
List of one-club men in association football

References

External links

1932 births
2009 deaths
Greek footballers
Greece international footballers
Association football forwards
Panionios F.C. players